The China Aerospace Science & Industry Corporation Limited (CASIC) is a Chinese state-owned enterprise that designs, develops and manufactures a range of spacecraft, launch vehicles, strategic and tactical missile systems, and ground equipment. CASIC has contributed to national projects such as crewed spaceflight and lunar exploration. CASIC is the largest maker of missiles in China.

History 
First established as the 5th Academy of the Ministry of Defense in October 1956, it went through numerous name changes including the Ministry of the 7th Machinery Industry, the Ministry of Aerospace Industry, the Ministry of Aviation and Aerospace Industry, China Aerospace Corporation, China Aerospace Machinery and Electronics Corporation in July 1999, and finally the present name China Aerospace Science & Industry Corporation in July 2001. CASIC owns seven academies, two scientific research and development bases, six public listed companies, and over 620 other companies and institutes scattered nationwide, with more than 145,987 employees.

From 2011 onwards, CASIC has supplied North Korea with 16-wheel and 18-wheel transporter erector launchers in support of North Korea's ballistic missile/nuclear program.

In 2017, the total assets of CASIC was US$ 44.27 billion, Revenue was US$34.07 billion, and profit was US$1.60 billion.

Since 2020, CASIC has shipped crude oil from Venezuela on tankers that it acquired from PetroChina.

U.S. investment prohibition 

In November 2020, Donald Trump issued an executive order prohibiting any American company or individual from owning shares in companies that the United States Department of Defense has listed as having links to the People's Liberation Army (PLA), which included CASIC.

Products 

CASIC is the biggest missile weapon system developing and manufacturing enterprise in China. It is known for developing, researching and manufacturing air defense missile systems, cruise missile systems, solid-propellant rockets, space technological products and other technologies with products covering various fields of land, sea, air, and electromagnetic spectrum. CASIC has provided dozens of advanced missile equipment systems for various nations, and contributed to Chinese crewed space flight, lunar exploration and other Chinese national projects.

CASIC engages in strategic industries concerning Chinese national security.

In early 2019, it was reported that CASIC had developed a "road-mobile laser defense system called the LW-30, which uses a high-energy laser beam to destroy targets." CASIC also introduced the "CM-401 supersonic anti-ship ballistic missile."

Partnerships and joint ventures 

On September 5, 2013, the G20 summit was held in Saint Petersburg, Russia. China's Paramount Leader Xi Jinping and Russia's president Vladimir Putin witnessed the signing of strategic cooperation agreement between CASIC (Gao Hongwei: chairman of CASIC) and Rostec.

On May 30, 2016, CASIC and Siemens signed a memorandum of understanding to establish a working team based on Made in China 2025 and German Industry 4.0 to establish strategic partnerships in the fields of industrial Internet and intelligent manufacturing. Siemens was devoted to electrification, automation, digitization, and creating an open IoT operating system based on the cloud platform.

On July 5, 2017, witnessed by Paramount Leader Xi Jinping and chancellor Angela Merkel, chairman of CASIC Gao Hongwei and Siemens CEO Joe Kaeser signed a strategic cooperation agreement in the fields of industrial Internet and intelligent manufacturing in Berlin.

See also 
 China Aerospace Science and Technology Corporation
 China National Space Administration
 Aviation Industry Corporation of China (AVIC)
 People's Liberation Army Air Force
 Commission of Science, Technology and Industry for National Defense

References

External links
  
  

Aerospace companies of China
Manufacturing companies based in Beijing
Manufacturing companies established in 1999
Commercial launch service providers
Communications satellite operators
Government-owned companies of China
Chinese companies established in 1999
Chinese brands
Defence companies of the People's Republic of China